Veit Etzold is a German author who became famous for his first fictional bestseller Final Cut in 2012 and following books such as Der Totenzeichner in 2015 or Dark Web in 2017. He is married to Saskia Etzold, a well-known forensic doctor at the Berliner Charité.

Etzold is also a university professor for marketing and corporate storytelling and in this role a commentator on developments in business and politics. He wrote several non-fictional books about strategy and storytelling such as Der weiße Hai im Weltraum in 2013 and Strategie: Planen–Erklären–Umsetzen in 2018. As a guest author for Germany's largest tabloid Bild, he formulated seven golden strategy rules when "Strategie" was published.

His fictional books are thrillers and the main protagonist is the fictional Berlin investigator Clara Vidalis, who is a chief inspector in the pathopsychology department at the Berlin State Criminal Police Office.

Fictional books in German (selection) 
 Final Cut: Thriller. Bastei Lübbe, Köln 2012, .
 Seelenangst: Thriller. Bastei Lübbe, Köln 2013, .
 Todeswächter: Thriller. Bastei Lübbe, Köln 2014, .
 Der Totenzeichner: Thriller. Bastei Lübbe, Köln 2015, .
 Skin: Thriller. Bastei Lübbe, Köln 2016, .
 Dark Web: Thriller. Droemer, München 2017, .
 Schmerzmacher: Ein Clara-Vidalis-Thriller. Knaur TB, München 2018, 
 Staatsfeind. Droemer TB, München 2019, .
 Final Control. Droemer TB, München 2020, .

References 

21st-century German novelists
21st-century German male writers
1973 births
Living people